Moscow attack may refer to:
Fire of Moscow (1547) blamed on the tsar's maternal relatives from the Glinski family
Fire of Moscow (1571) by Crimean Tatars
Fire of Moscow (1812) concurrent with Napoleon's occupation
Battle of Moscow (1941) during World War II
Moscow theater hostage crisis (2002) terrorist attack
Moscow Metro bombings (2010) terrorist attack